is a Japanese FM station based in Yuwa, Akita, Japan.

Programs in Akita dialect
Bangedai Tsubakidai 
 Abe Juzen no Hanasaka Jiisan

Rebroadcasters
 Noshiro.FM 88.8Mhz (Mini FM)

References

External links
 

Radio stations in Japan
Radio stations established in 2001
Mass media in Akita (city)